Starodubsky District is an administrative and municipal district (raion), one of the twenty-seven in Bryansk Oblast, Russia. It is located in the south of the oblast. Its administrative center is the town of Starodub (which is not administratively a part of the district). Population:   44,573 (2002 Census);  The population of Starodub accounts for 50.0% of the district's total population.

Administrative and municipal divisions
Within the framework of administrative divisions, Starodubsky District is one of the twenty-seven in the oblast. The town of Starodub serves as its administrative center, despite being incorporated separately as an urban administrative okrug—an administrative unit with the status equal to that of the districts.

As a municipal division, the district is incorporated as Starodubsky Municipal District. Starodub Urban Administrative Okrug is incorporated separately from the district as Starodub Urban Okrug.

References

Notes

Sources

Districts of Bryansk Oblast
